HMS Atherstone was a  of the Royal Navy. The Racecourse class comprised 32 paddlewheel coastal minesweeping sloops.

History

Great War
Built by Ailsa SB at Troon in Scotland, she was launched on 14 April 1916.  For the rest of the war she served with the Auxiliary Patrol.  Post war she was transferred to the Mine Clearance Service.

Between the wars
She was sold to The New Medway Steam Packet Company on 12 August 1927 and converted for excursion work on the Medway and Thames. She was renamed Queen of Kent.  For the next twelve years she could be found working from Sheerness and Southend.  Regular excursions took her to Gravesend, Margate, Clacton and Dover as well as cross-channel voyages to Calais, Boulogne and Dunkirk.

World War II
In September 1939 she was requisitioned by the Admiralty for minesweeping duties once more and commissioned as HMS Queen of Kent, pennant number J74. For Operation Overlord in June 1944 she was stationed at Peel Bank off the Isle of Wight as the Mulberry Accommodation & Despatch Control Ship. Subsequently, she was stationed at Dungeness. After the war she was returned in 1946 to her owners to recommence excursion work around the Thames Estuary.

Post war
In January 1949 she was sold to Red Funnel and transferred to Southampton.  After refitting at Thorneycroft's yard at Northam she was commissioned in the spring as the company's second Lorna Doone.  For the next three years she operated excursions from Bournemouth in the summer.  She was finally withdrawn and scrapped by Dover Industries Ltd at Dover Eastern Docks in 1952.

Notes

References

External links
  Details of service as Queen of Kent

 

Racecourse-class minesweepers
1916 ships
Ships built on the River Clyde
Ferry transport on the Isle of Wight
Paddle steamers of the United Kingdom
Ships of Red Funnel